Gala Rugby Football Club is a rugby union team based in Galashiels in the Scottish Borders. Founded in 1875, it plays its home games at Netherdale. The team currently competes in Scottish National League Division One, the second tier of Scottish club rugby, and the Border League (the oldest established rugby union league in the world).

Early history
The club was formed at a time of change in Galashiels, and the Borders in general, with the increasingly industrial textile industry. Cricket was played by the new influx of workers (particularly Yorkshire) and a winter alternate was needed, so a 'Football club' was formed in 1876. Although named a 'football' club they only ever played rugby union football and never association football. Rugby Union Football is now generally referred to as rugby, but at the time it was still commonly regarded as a code of football, as it technically still is.

In 1883, the club took part in the first ever Sevens tournament in Melrose and competed in the final with the hosts. Within a year they (and many other Border clubs) had started their own Sevens, also known as 'Sports'. In 1994, these separate tournaments were organized into the Borders Sevens Circuit league structure, the winners are crowned as the "Kings of the Sevens". Gala has been 'the Kings' on two occasions, in 2004 and the first ever winners in 1994.

In 1912 the club moved from Mossilee to a new ground at Netherdale, the new pavilion and grandstand built at a cost of 1150. 1931–32 saw Gala's first and only success in the Scottish Unofficial Championship under the Captaincy of Jimmy Ferguson.

From 1979, with Scottish internationalists Derek White and Peter Dods in the team, Gala won the Division 1 title three years in a row.

1995–present
In 1995, Gala was one of eight teams to play in the new Scottish Premier League. In 1999, inspired by a young Chris Patterson at Stand-off, Gala won a treble of medals, the Division 2 title, the Scottish Cup, and Melrose Sevens. The lowest point in modern history came in 2007, when Gala was relegated to Division 3 for the first time in its history. Worse was the fact that it was only points difference of 2 over the whole season. This gave the club the chance to clear out the dead wood and the team bounced back into Division 2 at the first time of asking.

The 2010–11 season saw promotion back into the top flight, its first full season back. 2011–12, saw a 3rd-place finish and the Scottish cup for the second time.
Gala finished 2012–13 as both Premier Division and Scottish cup runners-up.
2013–14 saw Gala finish runners-up in the Premiership again. This was a painful result as they were leading for much of the season only to lose out on the final match of the season to local rivals Melrose. They also reached the semi-finals of the Scottish cup and won the Border League.

In February 2017 the club launched a rugby academy, despite the realisation that they would be relegated from the premiership at the end of the season.

Honours
 Scottish Premiership
 Champions (3): 1979–80, 1980–81, 1982-83
 Runners-up (2): 2012-13, 2013-14
 Scottish League Championship, second-tier
 Champions (2): 1998–99, 2003-04
 Scottish League Championship, third-tier
 Champions (1): 2007-08
 Scottish Cup
 Winners (2): 1998–99, 2011-12
 Gala Sevens
 Champions (27): 1884, 1887, 1888, 1890, 1891, 1907, 1908, 1913, 1914, 1920, 1922, 1929, 1930, 1934, 1954, 1963, 1969, 1970, 1971, 1972, 1977, 1982, 1993, 1994, 1995, 2013, 2015
 Langholm Sevens
 Champions (10): 1908, 1910, 1924, 1964, 1967, 1969, 1970, 1972, 1993, 1998
 Melrose Sevens
 Champions (15): 1884, 1890, 1891, 1903, 1932, 1937, 1959, 1964, 1970, 1971, 1972, 1977, 1981, 1994, 1999
 Hawick Sevens
 Champions (16): 1891, 1893, 1901, 1907, 1919, 1923, 1931, 1940, 1949, 1956, 1967, 1972, 1982, 1995, 1996, 2017
 Berwick Sevens
 Champions (3): 2004, 2014, 2015
 Peebles Sevens
 Champions (5): 1924, 1954, 1957, 1961, 2015
 Kelso Sevens
 Champions (15): 1920, 1922, 1924, 1931, 1934, 1938, 1956, 1961, 1964, 1970, 1971, 1972, 1975, 1976, 2003
 Earlston Sevens
 Champions (18): 1923, 1927, 1928, 1930, 1938, 1952, 1959, 1960, 1964, 1968, 1971, 1988, 1989, 1991, 1993, 2000, 2004, 2017
 Selkirk Sevens
 Champions (11): 1921, 1925, 1950, 1952, 1962, 1963, 1964, 1968, 1970, 1971, 1992
 Kings of the Sevens
 Champions (4): 1994, 1995, 2004, 2015
Walkerburn Sevens
 Champions (3): 1924, 1926, 1938
 Portobello Sevens
 Champions (2): 1981, 1985
 Gala Thistle Sevens
 Champions (1): 1888
 St. Boswells Sevens
 Champions (1): 1978
 Ardrossan Sevens
 Champions (1): 1970
 Edinburgh Borderers Sevens
 Champions (1): 1923
 Preston Lodge Sevens
 Champions (1): 1985
 Penicuik Sevens
 Champions (3): 1975, 1977, 1983
 South of Scotland District Sevens
 Champions (1): 1974
 Stirling Sevens
 Champions (2): 1992, 1996
 Currie Sevens
 Champions (2): 1994, 1997

Notable players

British and Irish Lions

Scotland internationalists

The following former Gala players have represented Scotland at full international level.

Notable non-Scottish players

The following is a list of notable non-Scottish international representative former Gala players:

South players

The following former Gala players have represented South at provincial level.

Notable also outside rugby

The following is a list of notable former Gala players who have achieved notability in fields outwith rugby:

See also

 Galashiels
 Scottish Premiership
 Border League
 Borders Sevens Circuit
 Rugby union in the Borders

External links 
 Galashiels Rugby Football Club – Official website of the Galashiels Rugby Football Club

References

Sources
 Bath, Richard (ed.) The Complete Book of Rugby (Seven Oaks Ltd, 1997 )
 Godwin, Terry Complete Who's Who of International Rugby (Cassell, 1987)
 Jones, J.R. Encyclopedia of Rugby Union Football (Robert Hale, London, 1976 )

Scottish rugby union teams
Rugby clubs established in 1875
Rugby union clubs in the Scottish Borders
Galashiels